Saint Michael's Lent is a period of fasting observed in the Catholic Church, from the Feast of the Assumption on August 15 to Michaelmas (the feast of St Michael) on September 29, excluding Sundays. According to Bonaventure, St. Michael's Lent originates in Franciscan tradition. It is also mentioned in Little Flowers of St. Francis.
It was the custom for Francis of Assisi to fast before Michaelmas to honor the Blessed Virgin and St. Michael. As a pious custom, It isn’t intended to be as rigorous as Lent proper.

See also
 Lent
 Saint Martin's Lent

References

External links
 40-Day Devotion to St. Michael The Archangel

Christian fasting
Lent
Franciscan spirituality
August observances